Hybosorinae is a subfamily of scavenger scarab beetles in the family Hybosoridae. There is at least one extant genus, Hybosorus, in Hybosorinae, and several extinct genera.

References

Further reading

External links

 

scarabaeiformia
Articles created by Qbugbot